The 2014 Banja Luka Challenger was a professional tennis tournament played on clay courts. It was the thirteenth edition of the tournament which was part of the 2014 ATP Challenger Tour. It took place in Banja Luka, Bosnia and Herzegovina from 8 to 14 September 2014.

Singles main-draw entrants

Seeds

 1 Rankings are as of September 1, 2014.

Other entrants
The following players received wildcards into the singles main draw:
  Marko Djokovic 
  Nikola Milojević 
  Marko Tepavac 
  Miljan Zekić

The following players received entry from the qualifying draw:
  Filip Horanský
  Yannick Maden 
  Gleb Sakharov 
  Antonio Šančić

Champions

Singles

 Viktor Troicki def.  Albert Ramos, 7–5, 4–6, 7–5

Doubles

 Dino Marcan /  Antonio Šančić def.  Jaroslav Pospíšil /  Adrian Sikora, 7–5, 6–4

External links
Official Website

Banja Luka Challenger
Banja Luka Challenger
2014 in Bosnia and Herzegovina sport
September 2014 sports events in Europe